Naelah Alshorbaji (born January 27, 1998) is a Filipino-Syrian model and beauty pageant titleholder who was crowned Miss Philippines Earth 2021. She represented the Philippines at the Miss Earth 2021 pageant and finished as a Top 8 semifinalist.

Early life and education
Alshorbaji grew up in Syria surrounded by farm animals. She moved to the Philippines at the age of 11 because of the Syrian civil war.

Pageantry

Miss Philippines Earth 2021
In 2021, Alshorbaji joined the Miss Philippines Earth 2021 competition. 
At the end of the event, she was crowned Miss Philippines Earth 2021 succeeding Roxanne Allison Baeyens.

Miss Earth 2021
As the winner of Miss Philippines Earth 2021, Alshorbaji represented the Philippines at the Miss Earth 2021 pageant on November 21, 2021 and finished as a Top 8 Finalist.

Notes

References

External links

1998 births
Living people
Filipino female models
Syrian female models
Filipino people of Syrian descent
Miss Philippines Earth winners
Miss Earth 2021 contestants
People from Damascus
People from Parañaque